Tataurovo (Tatuur) is a rural locality (a settlement) in Pribaykalsky District, Republic of Buryatia, Russia. The population was 1,810 as of 2010. There are 22 streets.

Geography 
Tataurovo is located 18 km southwest of Turuntayevo (the district's administrative centre) by road. Ostrog is the nearest rural locality.

References 

Rural localities in Okinsky District